Sebastián Andrés Canobra Acosta (born 3 November 1994) is a Uruguayan former footballer who played as a midfielder.

Career

Club career

Canobra started his career with Uruguayan top flight side Atenas, where he made 14 league appearances and scored 0 goals and suffered relegation to the Uruguayan second tier. On 15 March 2015, Canobra debuted for Atenas during a 2–1 win over Wanderers. In 2017, he signed for Scherpenheuvel in Curaçao.

International career

He represented Uruguay at the 2011 FIFA U-17 World Cup.

References

External links
 

1994 births
Living people
Association football midfielders
Atenas de San Carlos players
Expatriate footballers in Curaçao
People from Maldonado, Uruguay
Sekshon Pagá players
Uruguay youth international footballers
Uruguayan expatriate footballers
Uruguayan footballers
Uruguayan Primera División players
Uruguayan Segunda División players
RKSV Scherpenheuvel players